Arthur Willey FRS (9 October 1867, Scarborough, North Yorkshire – 26 December 1942) was a British-Canadian zoologist.

After education at Kingswood School, Bath, he matriculated in 1887 at University College London and graduated there with B.Sc. in 1890.

After returning from the Marine Station (Stazione Zoologica), Naples, he became a fellow at University College London. From 1892 to 1894 he was a biological tutor at Columbia University. From 1894 to 1899 he held the Balfour Studentship of Cambridge, during which he went to the East Indies to investigate the embryology of the pearly nautilus. From 1899 to 1901 he was a lecturer in biology at Guy's Hospital. In 1902 he was elected F.R.S. From 1902 to 1909 he was the director of the Colombo Museum and the editor of Spolia Zeylanica. In 1907 he was a marine biologist for the Ceylon Government. In 1910 he became the Strathcona Professor at McGill University in Montreal and retired there as professor emeritus in 1932. In 1902 in Hendon, Middlesex, he married Emily Constance Bowd, and after his retirement in 1932 they lived in a cottage about an hour's drive from Montreal.

Eponyms
Balanoglossus jamaicensis 
Ramphotyphlops willeyi

Selected publications

References

1867 births
1942 deaths
Alumni of University College London
British zoologists
Canadian zoologists
English zoologists
Evolutionary biologists
Fellows of the Royal Society
Academic staff of McGill University
People educated at Kingswood School, Bath
People from Scarborough, North Yorkshire